The 7th constituency of the Hauts-de-Seine is a French legislative constituency in the Hauts-de-Seine département.

Description

Hauts-de-Seine's 7th constituency sits in the centre of the department bordering Paris just north of Boulogne-Billancourt and Yvelines to the west. It includes the extremely wealthy suburb of Saint-Cloud as well as Garches to the west and Rueil-Malmaison to the north west all of which form continuous urban area.

Politically the seat today is solidly conservative; however, prior to 1986 it elected a French Communist Party deputy at every election.

Historic Representative

Election results

2022

 
 
 
 
 
 
 
|-
| colspan="8" bgcolor="#E9E9E9"|
|-

2017

2012

2007

 
 
 
 
 
|-
| colspan="8" bgcolor="#E9E9E9"|
|-

2002

 
 
 
 
 
|-
| colspan="8" bgcolor="#E9E9E9"|
|-

1997

 
 
 
 
 
 
 
|-
| colspan="8" bgcolor="#E9E9E9"|
|-

Sources

 Official results of French elections from 1998: 

7